Minister Fatakeshto is a 2007 Bengali drama film starring Mithun Chakraborty and Koel Mallick in lead roles with George Baker Soumitra Chatterjee Deepankar De Shankar Chakraborty and Locket Chatterjee being the other roles. It is the sequel to MLA Fatakeshto (2006), and the second installment of the Fatakeshto series.

Plot
The film continues after the events of MLA Fatakeshto. MLA turned Home Minister, Fatakeshto, (Mithun Chakraborty) calls for discipline and a pro-people attitude although he has a few co-ministers against him. With his usual dialogue "Marbo ekaney, Lash podbe soshane" (I shall hit you here, but your body will fall at the crematorium), he bashes the goons right, left and middle. A lady reporter is reporting everything in "Star Ananda", a TV channel run by The Telegraph.

However, the Chief Minister (Soumitra Chatterjee) is in favor of Fatakeshto. With 4000 crores loss in Finance Department, Fatakeshto vows to take the Finance Ministry and recover the loss in seven days time. The Chief Minister also bestows the duty to Fatakeshto of removing the FM (one of the goons). With many hurdles on the way, Mithun recovers almost Rs. 3700 Cores loss by booking ministers for their misappropriation of funds but is left short of 300 crores.

In the meantime, the arch villain calls all his group and plans to finish Fatakeshto. Further he also calls for 48 Hours strike ("Bangla Bandh"), which Fatakeshto stops with his muscles. The villain then mixes dangerous germs in mineral water bottles which kills around 50 children in Bengal. This forces Fatakeshto to bow down in front of the villain and request life saving medicine lying with him to save the suffering children. With someone reporting about the mineral water mischief, Fatakeshto gets the arch villain arrested for the crime soon.

In the final showdown, the left out 300 crores is being collected through public donations dropped in big mud hundies (Lakshmi Badh). The villain comes out of jail on bail and loots the booty and takes it to an unknown destination to make Fatakehto responsible for the theft. One of the ministers who was with the villain somehow changes mind and informs Fatakeshto the location where the booty is hidden. CM requests him to go back to his role of GOONDAGARDI  (hooliganism) to recover people's money. Finally, Fatakeshto jumps into the den of the villain and fights around 200 to 300 karate masters. He finally kills the villain and captures the booty. The lost money is returned to the Chief Minister.

Cast
Mithun Chakraborty as Home Minister Krishno Deb Chatterjee aka Phatakeshto, who later becomes the Finance Minister
Koel Mallick as Chaitali Roy (News Reporter of Star Ananda)
Soumitra Chatterjee as Chief minister of West Bengal, who dreams of Sonar Bangla
George Baker as Raj Burman
Deepankar De as Finance minister Barun Mishra
Shankar Chakraborty as Advocate Biswanath Basak
Locket Chatterjee as Economist Manashi Mukherjee
Kaushik Banerjee as DCP of West Bengal Police
Dulal Lahiri as Health Minister
Sumit Ganguly as a local goon

Soundtrack

Awards

Box office
Made at the budget of 2.50 crores, the film was released with 50 prints and collected over 2.85 crores while crossing 50 days.

References

External links
 

2007 films
Bengali-language Indian films
Indian political films
Films about corruption in India
Films scored by Jeet Ganguly
2000s Bengali-language films
Films directed by Swapan Saha
Indian drama films